Sheffield, Brightside was a parliamentary constituency in the City of Sheffield. Created for the 1885 general election, and replaced at the 2010 general election by the new constituency of Sheffield Brightside and Hillsborough, it elected one Member of Parliament (MP) to the House of Commons of the Parliament of the United Kingdom, using the first-past-the-post voting system.

In its first fifty years, Brightside returned a variety of Liberal, Conservative and Labour MPs. However, from 1945 onwards, it became one of the Labour Party's safest seats in the United Kingdom. It was represented by David Blunkett from 1987 until its abolition; he continued to hold the successor seat until he retired in 2015, becoming the seat's longest-serving MP.

Boundaries
1885–1918: The Municipal Borough of Sheffield ward of Brightside.

1918–1950: The County Borough of Sheffield wards of Brightside and Burngreave.

1950–1983: The County Borough of Sheffield wards of Brightside, Firth Park, Nether Shire, and Southey Green.

1983–2010: The City of Sheffield wards of Brightside, Firth Park, Nether Shire, Owlerton, and Southey Green.

Sheffield Brightside covered the north of the city. It bordered the constituencies of Rotherham, Sheffield Central, Sheffield Heeley and Sheffield Hillsborough.

Following their review of parliamentary representation in South Yorkshire, the Boundary Commission for England recommended that Sheffield Brightside should gain all of Burngreave and Hillsborough wards, with Walkley moving to Sheffield Central, and that the constituency be renamed Sheffield Brightside and Hillsborough.

History
Sheffield Brightside was created in 1885 when the former Sheffield constituency was split into five constituencies.

Members of Parliament

Elections

Elections in the 1880s

Mundella was appointed President of the Board of Trade, requiring a by-election.

Elections in the 1890s

Mundella was appointed President of the Board of Trade, requiring a by-election.

Mundella's death caused a by-election.

Elections in the 1900s

Elections in the 1910s

Elections in the 1920s

Elections in the 1930s

Elections in the 1940s

Elections in the 1950s

Elections in the 1960s

Elections in the 1970s

Elections in the 1980s

Elections in the 1990s

Elections in the 2000s

See also 
 List of parliamentary constituencies in South Yorkshire

References

Sources
Sheffield Brightside BBC News, Election 2005
Sheffield Brightside BBC News, Vote 2001
Election history - Sheffield Brightside The Guardian

Political Science Resources  Election results from 1951 to present
F. W. S. Craig, British Parliamentary Election Results 1918 - 1949
F. W. S. Craig, British Parliamentary Election Results 1950 - 1970
Sheffield General Election Results 1945 - 2001, Sheffield City Council

Brightside
Constituencies of the Parliament of the United Kingdom established in 1885
Constituencies of the Parliament of the United Kingdom disestablished in 2010